A bean harvester, also known as a bean thresher or bean combine, is a threshing machine which is used to harvest beans. It mainly consists of a pickup, several beaters, shakers, one or several fans, elevators, conveyor belts, a storage bin, and usually a spreader at the rear. Until recently, the only practical manufacturer of bean harvesters was The Bidwell Bean Thresher Company.

Process

The pickup lifts the beans, which are arranged into windrows by rakes and pullers, off the ground and onto the main conveyor belt which feeds them into the first beater, which has many metal teeth, turns high RPMs, and does a significant portion of the threshing. From there the process varies from machine to machine. Basically the beans go through a series of more beaters and shakers.

See also

The Bidwell Bean Thresher Company

Harvesters
Agricultural machinery
Combine harvesters